Blacko is a civil parish in Pendle, Lancashire, England. It contains twelve listed buildings that are recorded in the National Heritage List for England.  All of the listed buildings are designated at Grade II, the lowest of the three grades, which is applied to "buildings of national importance and special interest".  The parish contains the village of Blacko, and is otherwise rural.  Most of the listed buildings are houses, farmhouses, or farm buildings.  The Leeds and Liverpool Canal passes through the parish, and a bridge crossing it is listed.  The other listed buildings consist of a public house, a war memorial, and a tower standing in a prominent position on a hill.

Buildings

References

Citations

Sources

Lists of listed buildings in Lancashire
Buildings and structures in the Borough of Pendle